Cut Out And Keep  is the most recent album from UK band Farrah.

Track listing 

Dumb Dumb Ditty
Do You Ever Think Of Me
Awkward Situation
No Reason Why
As Soon As I Get Over You
Fear Of Flying
School Reunion
The Things We Shouldn't Say
No-one Stays Together
The Only Way
Removal Man 
Wristband Generation (Japanese Version only) 
Lonely Boy (Japanese Version only)

Notes

Lonely Boy is a cover version of the song originally written and performed by Andrew Gold.

2007 albums
Farrah (band) albums
Lojinx albums